JLB may refer to:

 Jalan Besar MRT station, Singapore (by MRT station abbreviation)
 Jewish Lads' Brigade, a Jewish youth organisation
 Johann Ludwig Bach, German composer of the Bach family – specifically the catalogue of compositions of this composer uses the abbreviation JLB
 John Logie Baird, Scottish inventor
 Jorge Luis Borges, an Argentinian author
 Journal of Leukocyte Biology, a medical journal
 Long Beach Heliport, USA (by IATA code)
 WJLB, a radio station in Detroit, USA
 PT Jakarta Lingkar Baratsatu, a company operating the Jakarta Outer Ring Road
 JLB Credit, a fictional credit company from the British sitcom Peep Show